Sir John George Shaw Lefevre KCB (24 January 1797 – 20 August 1879) was a British barrister, Whig politician and civil servant.

Life
Shaw Lefevre was the son of Charles Shaw Lefevre by his wife Helen, daughter of John Lefevre. Charles Shaw-Lefevre, 1st Viscount Eversley, was his elder brother. He was educated at Trinity College, Cambridge, where he was Senior Wrangler in 1818, and was called to the Bar, Inner Temple. He was elected a Fellow of the Royal Society in 1820.

He was returned to Parliament for Petersfield in December 1832, but was unseated on petition in March 1833. He served under Lord Grey as Under-Secretary of State for War and the Colonies in 1834. The latter year Shaw Lefevre was appointed a Poor Law Commissioner after the passing of the Poor Law Amendment Act, which he remained until 1841. Between 1856 and 1875 he served as Clerk of the Parliaments. He also helped found the University of London and served as its Vice-Chancellor for many years. He was made a Knight Commander of the Order of the Bath (KCB) in 1857 for his public services.

Shaw Lefevre married Rachel Emily, daughter of Ichabod Wright, in 1824. They had one surviving son, George, who became a prominent politician and was ennobled as Baron Eversley, and five daughters.  One daughter, Madeleine Shaw-Lefevre, was the first Principal of Somerville Hall; another daughter, Rachel, married Arthur Hamilton-Gordon, son of the Prime Minister the 4th Earl of Aberdeen.

Shaw Lefevre died in August 1879, aged 82. His wife lived for six more years before dying in February 1885.

The Lefevre Peninsula in South Australia, was named by Governor John Hindmarsh on 3 June 1837 after Shaw Lefevre, who was one of South Australia's Colonisation Commissioners.

References

External links 
 
 Parliamentary Archives, Papers of John George Shaw Lefevre, 1797-1879

1797 births
1879 deaths
Senior Wranglers
Alumni of Trinity College, Cambridge
Whig (British political party) MPs
Members of the Parliament of the United Kingdom for English constituencies
UK MPs 1832–1835
Members of the Inner Temple
Vice-Chancellors of the University of London
Fellows of the Royal Society
Clerks of the Parliaments
Church Estates Commissioners
Knights Commander of the Order of the Bath
Committee members of the Society for the Diffusion of Useful Knowledge